Allan Baillie (born 28 January 1943) is an Australian writer. He was born in Scotland but moved with his family to Australia when he was seven. His first job was working as a Cadet Journalist, and then he began to work as a journalist working on papers such as the Melbourne Sun, The Telegraph and The Australian Women's Weekly having studied journalism at Melbourne University. Turning to literature his books include Adrift, Little Brother and The China Coin. He lives in Sydney, Australia, with his wife and two children.

Pipe incident 
Allan Baillie was injured on 8 November 2010 when he was sucked down a pipe at a swimming pool near Sydney and discharged onto the beach. He was swimming laps at Bilgola Beach rock pool with his wife when a Pittwater Council worker opened a valve to drain the pool for cleaning. He intends to seek compensation.

Bibliography

Children's novels
Adrift (1984)
Little Brother (1985)
Little Monster (1991)
The Bad Guys (1993) (aka The Bad Boys)
The Excuse (1997)
Foggy (2001)
Imp (2002)
My Australian Story: Riding with Thunderbolt: The Diary of Ben Cross (2004)

Children's picture books
Drac and the Gremlin (1988)
Bawshou Rescues the Sun: A Han Folktale  (1991)
The Boss (1992)
Rebel! (1993)
Old Magic (1996)
DragonQuest (1996)
Star Navigator (1997)
Archie: The Big Good Wolf (1998)

Children's non-fiction
Legends: Stories of Australia (1999)

Young adult novels
Riverman (1986)
Eagle Island (1987)  
Megan's Star (1988)
Hero (1990)
The China Coin (1991)
Magician (1992)
Songman (1994)
Secrets of Walden Rising (1996)
The Last Shot (1997)
Wreck! (1997)
Saving Abbie (2000)
Treasure Hunters (2002)
Cat's Mountain (2006)

Adult novels
Mask Maker (1974)

Collections
Creature (1987)
Mates and Other Stories (1989)
Dream Catcher and Other Stories (1995)
The Phone Book (1995)
Ten Out of Ten (2003)
A Taste of Cockroach (2005)

Short fiction
"The Plumber" (1988) in Dream Catcher and Other Stories (ed. Allan Baillie)
"Silent Night" (1989) in Bizarre (ed. Penny Matthews)
"Liz" (1989) in Amazing (ed. Penny Matthews)
"The Mouth" (1990) in Weird (ed. Penny Matthews)
"Dream Catcher" (1991) in Into the Future (ed. Toss Gascoigne, Jo Goodman, Margot Tyrrell)
"The Champion" (1991) in Dream Catcher and Other Stories (ed. Allan Baillie)
"The Bed-Sitter" (1991) in Dream Catcher and Other Stories (ed. Allan Baillie)
"Bones" (1992) in Spine Chilling (ed. Penny Matthews)
"Snatch" (1992) in Goodbye and Hello (ed. Margot Hillel)
"The Nag" (1995) in Dream Catcher and Other Stories (ed. Allan Baillie)
"Cheat!" (1995) in Dream Catcher and Other Stories (ed. Allan Baillie)
"The Gun" (1995) in Dream Catcher and Other Stories (ed. Allan Baillie)
"The Forest" (1995) in Dream Catcher and Other Stories (ed. Allan Baillie)
"Mobile" (1995) in Dream Catcher and Other Stories (ed. Allan Baillie)
"The Greening" (2000) in Tales from the Wasteland (ed. Paul Collins)
"The Plot — Mordred's story" (2002) in The Road to Camelot (ed. Sophie Masson)

Awards and nominations
Australian Multicultural Children's BOTY Award  – Miscellaneous category- Joint Winner – 1992 for The China Coin  
CBC Book of the Year  – Picture Book category – Joint Winner – 1989 for Drac & the Gremlin  
Various nominations
W.A. Young Readers Book Award (WAYRA) – listed twice (once shortlisted)
S.A. Kanga Awards – listed once
New South Wales State Literary Award – shortlisted twice
Kids Own Aust Literature Award (KOALA) – shortlisted three times
Children's Peace Lit Award (PEACE)  – Best Book – shortlisted once
Young Aust Best Book Award (YABBA)  – Picture Book – shortlisted once

References

External links

1943 births
20th-century Australian novelists
20th-century Australian male writers
21st-century Australian novelists
Australian male novelists
Australian children's writers
Australian male short story writers
Scottish novelists
Living people
Scottish children's writers
Scottish short story writers
Australian science fiction writers
Scottish science fiction writers
20th-century Australian short story writers
21st-century Australian short story writers
21st-century Australian male writers
British emigrants to Australia